The Shakedown is an American pre-Code 1929 action/comedy/sports drama film, directed by William Wyler and starring James Murray, Barbara Kent, and Jack Hanlon.

Considered a part-talkie, the film was released in parallel silent and sound versions. Once believed lost, The Shakedown was discovered and restored by the staff of the George Eastman House in 1998. Director William Wyler made the move up to talking pictures with this blend of action and comedy.

Synopsis
Dave Roberts (James Murray) is a professional boxer better at losing in fixed matches than in knocking out his opponents. He turns up in towns and is part of a group who sets up corrupt boxing matches. Dave's life on the margins changes after he meets an honest woman and rescues an orphan from an oncoming train. As he begins to care for them, he ultimately has to decide whether to continue in his low-life ways or turn the tables on those who have been forcing him to participate in them.

Cast
James Murray as Dave Roberts
Barbara Kent as Marjorie
George Kotsonaros as Battling Roff
Wheeler Oakman as Manager
Jack Hanlon as Clem
Harry Gribbon as Dugan
Annabelle Magnus as Little Girl (uncredited)
George Marion as Screaming Fight Spectator with White Beard (uncredited)
Jack McHugh as Boy that fights Clem (uncredited)
Jack Raymond as Salesman (uncredited)
Harry Tenbrook as Manager's Henchman (uncredited)
William Wyler as Photographer at Fight Arena (uncredited)
John Huston as extra (uncredited)

References

External links

1929 films
American silent feature films
Films directed by William Wyler
American black-and-white films
Transitional sound comedy-drama films
Universal Pictures films
American action comedy-drama films
1920s action comedy-drama films
1920s sports comedy-drama films
American sports comedy-drama films
1929 comedy films
1929 drama films
1920s English-language films
1920s American films
Silent American comedy-drama films